László Márkus (10 June 1927 – 30 December 1985) was a Hungarian actor. He appeared in over 90 films and television shows between 1952 and 1985. He starred in the 1985 film Első kétszáz évem, which was entered into the 36th Berlin International Film Festival.

Selected filmography 
 St. Peter's Umbrella (1958)
 Two Half Times in Hell (1961)
 The Corporal and Others (1965)
 Stars of Eger (1968)
 Hugo the Hippo (1973)
 Football of the Good Old Days (1973)
 The Fifth Seal (1976)
 Első kétszáz évem (1985)

References

External links 

1927 births
1985 deaths
Hungarian male film actors
Male actors from Budapest
20th-century Hungarian male actors
Hungarian male television actors